Martyn Bennett (1971–2005) was a Scottish musician.

Martyn Bennett may also refer to:

 Martyn Bennett (album), by the above artist
 Martyn Bennett (footballer) (born 1961), English footballer

See also
 Martin Bennett, Australian inorganic chemist